Nahand (also known as Nagyān and Nagyant) is a village in Mavazekhan-e Sharqi Rural District of Khvajeh District, Heris County, East Azerbaijan province, Iran. At the 2006 National Census, its population was 1,222 in 304 households. The following census in 2011 counted 990 people in 288 households. The latest census in 2016 showed a population of 1,061 people in 327 households; it was the largest village in its rural district.

References 

Heris County

Populated places in East Azerbaijan Province

Populated places in Heris County